German submarine U-456 was a Type VIIC U-boat built for Nazi Germany's Kriegsmarine for service during World War II.
She was laid down on 3 September 1940 by Deutsche Werke in Kiel as yard number 287, launched on 21 June 1941 and commissioned on 18 September 1941 under Kapitänleutnant Max-Martin Teichert (Knight's Cross).

Design
German Type VIIC submarines were preceded by the shorter Type VIIB submarines. U-456 had a displacement of  when at the surface and  while submerged. She had two shafts and two  propellers.

U-456 was fitted with five  torpedo tubes (four fitted at the bow and one at the stern), fourteen torpedoes, one  SK C/35 naval gun, 220 rounds, and a  C/30 anti-aircraft gun. The boat had a complement of between forty-four and sixty.

Service history
The boat's service began on 28 September 1941 with training as part of the 6th U-boat Flotilla. She was transferred to the 11th flotilla on 1 July 1942 and then to the 1st flotilla on 1 December 1942.

HMS Edinburgh
In the late afternoon of 30 April 1942, during the attack on the Arctic Convoy QP 11, two of her torpedoes struck and crippled the Royal Navy light cruiser . At the time Edinburgh was carrying many tons of gold bullion from the USSR destined for the UK.

Wolfpacks
She took part in ten wolfpacks, namely:
 Umbau (4 – 15 February 1942)
 Umhang (10 – 16 March 1942)
 Eiswolf (29 – 31 March 1942)
 Robbenschlag (7 – 14 April 1942)
 Blutrausch (15 – 19 April 1942)
 Strauchritter (29 April – 3 May 1942)
 Eisteufel (27 June – 5 July 1942)
 Boreas (27 – 30 November 1942)
 Landsknecht (19 – 28 January 1943)
 Drossel (29 April – 12 May 1943)

Fate
In the early morning light U-456 was caught on the surface by an RAF Coastal Command Liberator bomber of 86 Squadron operating out of Northern Ireland, as she circled ahead of convoy HX 237. 
U-456 dived at once, but not before the aircraft had launched the new American Fido acoustic homing torpedo at the submerged submarine. The aircraft, low on fuel, was unable to press home the attack.
U-456 was badly damaged and forced to re-surface.

Summary of raiding history

References

Notes

Citations

Bibliography

External links

Ships lost with all hands
German Type VIIC submarines
1941 ships
U-boats commissioned in 1941
U-boats sunk in 1943
U-boats sunk by British warships
World War II submarines of Germany
World War II shipwrecks in the Atlantic Ocean
Ships built in Kiel
Maritime incidents in May 1943